Eugene Dorflinger Estate is a historic home and estate located at Texas Township, Wayne County, Pennsylvania.  The house was built in 1865, and is a two-story, wood-frame dwelling with Victorian gingerbread trim.  Also on the property are the contributing museum building, carriage house, photography studio, wash house, outhouse, and gazebo.  The buildings are what is remaining from the Dorflinger Glass Works.

The property is now home to the Dorflinger-Suydam Wildlife Sanctuary, which protects almost 600 acres and features about 5 miles of trails.

The site also includes the Dorflinger Glass Museum that features over 900 pieces of cut lead crystal that were manufactured by the Dorflinger Glass Works.

The estate was added to the National Register of Historic Places in 1978.

Gallery

References

External links
 

Houses in Wayne County, Pennsylvania
Protected areas of Wayne County, Pennsylvania
Museums in Wayne County, Pennsylvania
Glass museums and galleries
Decorative arts museums in the United States
Nature reserves in Pennsylvania
Houses on the National Register of Historic Places in Pennsylvania
Houses completed in 1865
National Register of Historic Places in Wayne County, Pennsylvania
1865 establishments in Pennsylvania